Samuel William Christopher Watson IV (born March 7, 1974), better known by his stage name Krizz Kaliko, is an American rapper, singer, songwriter, and voice actor. He is a longtime collaborator with fellow hometown native Tech N9ne and was signed to Strange Music from its inception in 1999 up to forming his own label Ear House Inc. in 2021.

Career
Krizz Kaliko began his musical career in the late 1990s when he began working with local producer IcyRoc Kraven. Another local rapper by the name of Tech N9ne was also collaborating with IcyRoc at the time, which led to the two rappers meeting. At the time, Tech N9ne was working on a song titled "Who You Came To See" and Kaliko made a comment that the song could have a better hook. Tech offered up the opportunity to prove his case, and Tech was blown away when Kaliko did. Tech would bring Kaliko into his "inner circle", which would eventually result in Kaliko signing to the new-found label Strange Music co-owned by Tech N9ne and Travis O'Guin.

Since then, Kaliko has often contributed to albums put out by Tech N9ne, be it being featured as a rapper or simply providing background vocals for tracks on the album. Although most of his work is that of his collaborations with Tech N9ne, he has also performed similar tasks for former labelmates Kutt Calhoun, Rittz, and fellow labelmates Skatterman & Snug Brim, Ces Cru, and Prozak. Other collaborations include tracks with the Kottonmouth Kings, Potluck, E-40, T-Pain, Twiztid, Andy Mineo, Chris B, and RM from South Korean group BTS .

His debut album, Vitiligo, released on May 6, 2008, charted on several Billboard charts, including peaking at number 19 on the Top Independent Albums in the week of May 28, 2008. In the same week, he peaked at number 167 on the Billboard 200.

His second studio album, Genius, was released on July 14, 2009.

A number of his songs can be heard in the background of the strip club scenes in the movie Big Fan starring Patton Oswalt.

Kaliko chose the title Shock Treatment for his third studio album. Other titles he considered were Son of Sam and Walk on Water.

S.I.C., his first EP, was released on May 17, 2011. In June 2011, he was featured on Winnipeg's Most's second single, "Forgive Me", from their second album, GoodFellaz.

On May 15, 2012, Kaliko released his fourth studio album, titled Kickin' and Screamin'''. It is currently his highest charting album on the Billboard 200. The album has features from long-time collaborator Tech N9ne, as well as rappers Twista, Chamillionaire, T-Pain, Twiztid and Rittz, while the production is almost entirely handled by Seven.

In November, Kaliko released his second EP, Neh'mind. The song "Damage" featuring Snow Tha Product was made the lead single. A video for "Damage" was shot and released on YouTube on December 14, and received over 100,000 views in two weeks.

On August 27, 2013, Kaliko released his fifth album, Son of Sam. It features guest appearances from Tech N9ne, CES Cru, Kortney Leveringston, IcyRoc Kravyn, and his wife Crystal Watson. The album debuted at number 56 on the Billboard 200 chart, with first-week sales of 8,000 copies in the United States.

On April 8, 2016, Kaliko released his sixth studio album, GO. Unlike his previous albums, which were predominantly hip-hop, GO is his first R&B/pop album. The album features labelmates Tech N9ne, Stevie Stone, Rittz, CES Cru, Wrekonize and JL B.Hood. It went on to chart as the number 4 Rap album on Billboard and number 28 in the Top 200.

On October 6, 2019, Kaliko announced his intention to leave Strange Music on social media. On October 20, 2019, however, he appeared to have a change of heart, signing a new contract with Strange Music on stage.

On September 18, 2020, Kaliko returned with his seventh album, Legend, his first project in four years.

On May 15, 2021, it was announced during Kaliko's virtual concert event "The Reveal" that he had officially left Strange Music to form his own label Ear House Inc. with his wife Crystal.

Kaliko voiced Dinobot in the third chapter of Transformers: War for Cybertron Trilogy, released on July 29, 2021, as well as Leroy Smith in the English dub of Tekken: Bloodline, which released on August 18, 2022.

Personal life
Kaliko is afflicted with an autoimmune form of vitiligo, a skin condition characterized by smooth, white patches on various parts of the body, caused by the loss of natural pigment. Several of these patches are clearly visible on his face. He used the name of the disease as the title for his debut album.

Kaliko has also been diagnosed with bipolar disorder. He named a track on his second album after the disorder.

Filmography

Discography

 Vitiligo (2008)
 Genius (2009)
 Shock Treatment (2010)
 Kickin' and Screamin' (2012)
 Son of Sam (2013)
 GO (2016)
 Legend'' (2020)

References

External links

1974 births
African-American male rappers
American hip hop singers
American male voice actors
Horrorcore artists
Living people
Midwest hip hop musicians  
People with bipolar disorder
People with vitiligo
Rappers from Kansas City, Missouri
Underground rappers
20th-century African-American people
21st-century African-American musicians
21st-century American male actors
21st-century American male musicians
21st-century American rappers